Ken Park is a 2002 erotic drama which revolves around the abusive and dysfunctional lives of several teenagers, set in the city of Visalia, California. It was written by Harmony Korine, who based it on Larry Clark's journals and stories. The film was directed and shot by Clark and Edward Lachman. The film is an international co-production of the United States, the Netherlands, and France.

Plot
The title character Ken Park (nicknamed "Krap Nek": his name spelled and pronounced backward), is a teenager skateboarding across Visalia, California. He arrives at a skate park, where he casually sets up a camcorder, smiles, and shoots himself in the temple with a handgun. His death is used to bookend the film, which follows the lives of four other teenagers who knew him.

Shawn is the most stable of the four main characters. Throughout the story, he has an ongoing sexual relationship with his girlfriend's mother Rhonda, whom he tells that he fantasizes about being with while having sex with her daughter, Hannah. He casually socializes with their family, the rest of whom are completely unaware of the affair.

Claude fends off physical and emotional abuse from his alcoholic father while he tries to take care of his neglectful pregnant mother, who never does anything to defend him. Claude's father detests him for not being masculine enough. However, after coming home drunk one night, he attempts to perform oral sex on Claude, which prompts the boy to run away from home.

Peaches is a girl who lives alone with her obsessive and highly-religious father, who fixates on her as the innocent embodiment of her deceased mother. When he catches her having sex with her boyfriend Curtis – whom she has playfully tied to her bed – he beats the boy and savagely disciplines her, then forces her to participate in a quasi-incestuous wedding ritual with him.

Tate is an unstable and sadistic adolescent living with his grandparents, whom he resents and abuses verbally. He engages in autoerotic asphyxiation while masturbating to a video of a woman playing tennis. He eventually kills his grandparents, in retaliation for petty grievances, and finds that it arouses him sexually. He records himself on his tape recorder so that the police will know how and why he did it, puts his grandfather's dentures in his mouth, lies naked in his bed, and falls asleep. He is later arrested.

The film cuts frequently between these subplots, with no overlap of characters or events until the end, when Shawn, Claude, and Peaches meet and have a threesome. In a game of "who am I?" afterward, they refer to an unnamed person they know who is now dead. The film cuts to a title screen, followed by a flashback to before the opening scene. Ken has impregnated his girlfriend and taken a menial job. At the skate park, they discuss whether to abort the pregnancy, and she asks Ken rhetorically if he's glad his mother didn't abort him; he does not answer.

Cast
 Tiffany Limos as "Peaches"
 James Bullard as Shawn
 Stephen Jasso as Claude
 James Ransone as Tate
 Adam Chubbuck as Ken Park
 Maeve Quinlan as Rhonda
 Bill Fagerbakke as Bob
 Eddie Daniels as Shawn's Mother
 Seth Gray as Shawn's Brother
 Patricia Place as Tate's Grandmother
 Harrison Young as Tate's Grandfather
 Amanda Plummer as Claude's Pregnant Mother
 Wade Williams as Claude's Father
 Julio Oscar Mechoso as Peaches' Father
 Zara McDowell as Zoe
 Mike Apaletegui as Curtis
 Richard Riehle as "Murph" Murphy
 Larry Clark as Hot Dog Vendor

Production
Clark attempted to write the first script for Ken Park, basing it on personal experiences and people with whom he had grown up. Dissatisfied with his own draft, he hired Harmony Korine to pen the screenplay. Clark ultimately used most of Korine's script, but rewrote the ending. The film was given a $1.3 million budget. The arrangement was to film using digital video, but Clark and Lachman used 35mm film instead.

Distribution
Although it was sold for distribution to some 30 countries, the film was not shown in the United Kingdom after director Larry Clark assaulted Hamish McAlpine, the head of the UK distributor for the film, Metro Tartan. Clark is alleged to have been angry over McAlpine's remarks about 9/11. Clark was arrested and spent several hours in custody, and McAlpine was left with a broken nose. The film has not been released in the United States since its initial showing at the Telluride Film Festival in 2002. Clark says that this is because of the producer's failure to get copyright releases for the music used. The film was banned in Australia due to its graphic sexual content and portrayals of underage sexual activity after it was refused a classification by the Australian Classification Board in 2003. A protest screening held in Sydney, hosted by film critic Margaret Pomeranz, was shut down by the police.

Critical reception
Review aggregator website Rotten Tomatoes reports a 46% approval rating based on 13 reviews. Ed Gonzales of Slant Magazine noted some redeeming elements in an "otherwise familiar Kids procedural" in which "the parents are all monsters of some kind and there’s an excuse for every teenager’s bad behavior". Rob Gonsalves of eFilmCritic, wrote that the film "is about people lost in a haze of contempt and despair, trying to wrest some love or relief out of the situation." Michael Rechtshaffen of The Hollywood Reporter described it as "a ragingly controversial feature that makes it very tricky to distinguish between insightful and incite-ful." Todd McCarthy of Variety described it as "Beautifully crafted but emotionally dispiriting and alienating in its insistence on spotlighting only the negative aspects of life". Lee Marshall of Screen Daily wrote that "Clark, being Clark, pushes things a little too far; so a not entirely constructive tension is set up between the need to show and the desire to shock."

Soundtrack

 Bouncing Souls — "Lamar Vannoy"
 Rancid — "Antennas"
 Gary Stewart — "Out of Hand"
 Tha Alkaholks — "Likwit"
KMD — "What a Nigga Know"
Blackalicious — "Deception"
Merle Haggard — "Mom and Dad's Waltz"
Black Star — "Brown Skin Lady"
Jerry Lee Lewis — "Good Time Charlie's Got the Blues"
The Roots — "Do You Want More?!!!??!"
Gary Stewart — "Shady Streets"
Quasimoto — "Put A Curse On You"
Hank Ballard — "Henry's Got Flat Feet"
The Shaggs — "Who Are Parents?"

See also
 Kids (film)
 Unsimulated sex''

References

External links

 
 Inside Film Magazine's Phillip Cenere reports on Australian ban of Ken Park
 Ken Park @ Harmony-Korine.com

2002 films
2000s erotic drama films
American erotic drama films
Dutch erotic drama films
French erotic drama films
2000s English-language films
English-language Dutch films
English-language French films
Films about suicide
Films directed by Larry Clark
Films about child sexual abuse
Films about dysfunctional families
Incest in film
American independent films
Juvenile sexuality in films
American nonlinear narrative films
Skateboarding films
Dutch independent films
French independent films
Adultery in films
Film censorship in the United Kingdom
Film censorship in Australia
Film controversies in the United Kingdom
Film controversies in Australia
Obscenity controversies in film
Sexual-related controversies in film
2002 independent films
Softcore pornography
French nonlinear narrative films
Teensploitation
2002 drama films
2000s American films
2000s French films